Donald Jack Hopgood  (born 5 September 1938) is a former South Australian politician who was the 5th Deputy Premier of South Australia from 1985 to 1992. Hopgood represented the House of Assembly seats of Mawson from 1970 to 1977 and Baudin from 1977 to 1993 for the South Australian Branch of the Australian Labor Party, and was promoted to the Labor frontbench in 1973.

Hopgood was moderator of the Synod of South Australia of the Uniting Church in Australia from 1997 to 1999.

Early life
Hopgood was born in 1938 at Prospect, an inner northern suburb of Adelaide. His father worked at Berger Paints. His maternal grandfather worked at Islington Railway Workshops. His paternal grandfather was a retired typesetter. Hopgood grew up in Prospect and was a member of the Prospect North Methodist Church Sunday school. He went to Prospect Primary School and Adelaide Boys' High School.

Hopgood started learning to play jazz trumpet at age 18. He played in jazz bands at church and university. He went to Adelaide Teachers' College on Kintore Avenue, Adelaide and taught at Le Fevre Boys’ Technical High School for three years then moved to Whyalla Technical High School for a year (while still studying), then Westminster School for almost five years. He won a scholarship to study for a PhD from Flinders University after he had been a teacher. He was still studying for his PhD when he was elected to state parliament, so converted the final year to part-time.

References

Further reading
 
 

|-

1938 births
Living people
Members of the South Australian House of Assembly
Officers of the Order of Australia
Australian Labor Party members of the Parliament of South Australia
People educated at Adelaide High School
Politicians from Adelaide
Australian schoolteachers
Flinders University alumni